Joan Lovely is a Democratic member of the Massachusetts Senate, representing the Second Essex district in the Massachusetts Senate since 2013. She previously served on the Salem, Massachusetts City Council from 1998 to 2012 and was Council President in 2001 and 2012.

See also
 2019–2020 Massachusetts legislature
 2021–2022 Massachusetts legislature

References

Joan Lovely Massachusetts General Court

Year of birth missing (living people)
Living people
Politicians from Salem, Massachusetts
Salem State University alumni
Massachusetts School of Law alumni
Democratic Party Massachusetts state senators
21st-century American politicians